Jeremiah Briscoe (born August 15, 1993) is a former gridiron football quarterback.  He played college football at Sam Houston State, where he was a two-time winner of the Walter Payton Award. He played for the Edmonton Eskimos of the Canadian Football League (CFL).

High school
Originally a three-year letterer at Second Baptist, Briscoe played wide receiver as a sophomore and caught 51 passes for 792 yards and five touchdowns, while playing backup quarterback and throwing for 3 touchdowns. He became the quarterback as a junior passed for 2,358 yards and 23 touchdowns on zero interceptions. Jeremiah transferred to Stratford for his senior year and threw for 1,863 yards and 12 touchdowns on only 3 interceptions, also running for 6 more rushing touchdowns as a senior. Moreso than football, Briscoe actually preferred baseball to football and had a 2.48 ERA with 55 strikeouts in 48 innings pitched.

Considered a three-star recruit by 247sports, Briscoe chose a full-ride scholarship to the University of Alabama at Birmingham over offers from Baylor, Boise State, Lamar, Sam Houston State, Stephen F Austin, Wyoming, and preferred walk-on's from Texas A&M and Ole Miss. He was also recruited by UAB to play baseball, and sought baseball recruitment from Stephen F Austin, Texas A&M, and Baylor.

College career
Briscoe started his college career at UAB in 2014, where he threw for 361 yards and 3 touchdowns in six games, one of which he started. He also played baseball. Briscoe transferred to Sam Houston State University after UAB's football program was cut following his freshman year.

Despite being a sophomore backup at Sam Houston State behind Jared Johnson, Briscoe passed for 1,883 yards and 14 touchdowns in the 2015 season. As a junior in the 2016 season, Briscoe was a full-time starter and won the Walter Payton Award after passing for 4,602 yards and 57 touchdowns, an FCS single-season record until 2022, when Lindsey Scott Jr. threw 60 for Incarnate Word.

As a senior in 2017, Briscoe threw for 5,003 yards and 46 touchdowns, later winning the Walter Payton a second time. He is only the second player in FCS history to win the Walter Payton more than once.

Statistics

Professional career
Briscoe was originally invited to a training camp with the Pittsburgh Steelers, but was not signed after camp ended. On April 27, 2018, Briscoe signed with the Philadelphia Eagles. However, Briscoe   appear in only one scrimmage before being cut by the team on August 17, 2018.

On November 7, 2018, Jeremiah Briscoe signed with the Edmonton Eskimos of the Canadian Football League. Briscoe played with the Eskimos for three seasons as a reserve quarterback and practice squad player. He appeared in 10 games throughout his career, where he had two incomplete passes against the Hamilton Tiger-Cats on October 4, 2019. He also had one tackle.

Briscoe retired from football on June 25, 2021.

References

External links
 Sam Houston State profile

1993 births
Living people
American football quarterbacks
Canadian football quarterbacks
Edmonton Elks players
Sam Houston Bearkats football players
UAB Blazers football players
Walter Payton Award winners
Players of American football from Houston
Players of Canadian football from Houston